Bathukamma is a flower-festival celebrated by the women of Telangana and some parts of Andhra Pradesh. Every year this festival is celebrated as per the Sathavahana calendar for nine days starting on Pitru Amavasya, which usually coincides with the months September–October of the Gregorian calendar. Bathukamma is celebrated for nine days and corresponds to the festivals of Sarada Navratri and Durga Puja. It starts on the day of Mahalaya Amavasya and the 9-day festivities will culminate on "Saddula Bathukamma" or "Pedda Bathukamma." Bathukamma is followed by Boddemma, which is a 7-day festival. The Boddemma festival that marks the ending of Varsha Ruthu whereas Bathukamma marks the beginning of Sarad or Sharath Ruthu.

Bathukamma, along with the festivals of Bonalu, Sammakka Saralamma Jatara, and Peerla Panduga, gained increased significance during the Telangana movement as a marker of the region's separate identity from Andhra Pradesh, and its celebration has become much more prominent with the secession of Telangana from Andhra Pradesh in 2014. Bathukamma is a beautiful flower stack, arranged with different unique seasonal flowers most of them with medicinal values, in seven concentric layers in the shape of temple gopuram. In Telugu, ‘Bathukamma' means ‘Mother Goddess come Alive’. Historically, Bathukamma meant "the festival of life" and was a celebration of the harvest season in the Deccan region (October).

A celebration of femininity, the women of Telangana dress up in traditional saris, combining it with jewels and other accessories. Teenage Girls wear Langa-Oni/Half-Sarees/Lehenga Choli combining it with jewels in order to bring out the traditional grace of the attire.

 Day 1: Engili pula Bathukamma
 Day 2: Atukula Bathukamma
 Day 3: Muddapappu Bathukamma
 Day 4: Nanabiyyam Bathukamma
 Day 5: Atla Bathukamma
 Day 6: Aligina Bathukamma (alaka Bathukamma)
 Day 7: Vepakayala Bathukamma
 Day 8: Vennae muddala Bathukamma
 Day 9: Saddhula Bathukamma 
Brothers bring flowers to mother and sisters to do bathukamma

Chalukyas of Vemulavada 

Chalukyas of Vemulavada, based in Vemulawada were feudatories of Rashtrakuta kings. In the wars between Chola kings and Rashtrakutas these Chalukyas sided the Rashtrakutas. 
AD 973 Rashtrakuta feudal Chalukya lord Tailapa II defeated the last king Karka-II of Rashtrakuta kings and established independent Kalyani Chalukya kingdom. After the death of Tailapa II in AD 997 his son Satyashraya became the king. In the erstwhile kingdom of Vemulavaada (present Rajanna Sircilla District), Sri Raja Rajeshwara Temple is popular. Chola king, Paraantaka Sundara Chola was in trouble while  defending the attack from Rashtrakuta king. Learning that Rajarajeshwara will help those in troubles Paraantaka Chola turned as his devotee.
Also, he named his son as Raja Raja. This is evident from Arikesari epigraph. Raja Raja Chola ruled between AD 985 and 1014. His son Rajendra Chola attacked as a Chief of Army and stood victorious on Satyaasraya. As a sign of his victory he destroyed Rajeshwara’s temple and took the Bruhat (huge) Shiva linga to his father as a gift. In 1006 Raja Raja Chola had started building a temple to this huge Shivalinga (Brihadeswara). In 1010 he installed this Linga. Chola kings also announced in Tamil epigraphs that this Brihadeswara temple is built from the wealth looted in the attack on Vemulavaada Chalukya kingdom.
 
Even now the similarities between the Shivalinga of Vemulavaada Bheemeshwaralayam and Shivalinga of Brihadeeswaralayam of Tanjavuru can be seen. Taking away the Shivalinga from Vemulavaada to Tanjavuru downhearted people of the Kingdom. After leaving the Kingdom, in the form of Linga, along with an attempt to console Paarvathi (Bruhadamma) in the temple here and to inform sorrowfulness to Cholas, Batukamma is arranged with flowers like Meru mountain. On its top Gouramma made with turmeric is placed and is recounted with sing and play for nine days. Dispatching her in water and calling her back took a shape of a festival.

Preparation

Men in the house gather flowers Bathukamma Flowers from the wild plains like Celosia, Senna, Marigold, Chrysanthemum, Indian Lotus, Cucurbita leaves & flowers, Cucumis Sativus leaves & flowers, Memecylon edule, Tridax procumbens, Trachyspermum ammi, Katla, Teku Flowers, etc., which bloom in this season in various vibrant colors all across the uncultivated and barren plains of the region.

Preparing a Bathukamma is a folk art. Women start preparing Bathukamma from the afternoon. They cut the flowers leaving the little length base, some dip Gunugu (Celosia) flowers in various vibrant colours, some scented and arrange them on a wide plate called Thambalam.

The songs are to invoke the blessings of various goddesses. 

Each day has a name mainly signifying the type of "naivedyam" (food offering) offered. Most of the naivedyam offered are very simple to prepare, and usually young children or young girls are mainly involved in the preparation of the offerings for the first eight days of the festival. The last day, called saddula Bathukamma is when all the women take part in the preparation. Following is the list of names for each day and the naivedyam offered on that day.

 Engili pula Bathukamma- The first day of the festival falls on Mahalaya Amavasya, also known as Pethara Amavasya in Telangana region.
Food offering/Naivedyam: Nuvvulu (Sesame seeds) with biyyampindi (rice flour) or nookalu (coarsely ground wet rice).
 Atkula Bathukamma: The second day is called Atkula bathukamma, falls on the Padyami (first day) of Ashwayuja masam.
Food offering/Naivedyam: Sappidi pappu (Bland boiled lentils), bellam (jaggery), and atkulu (flattened parboiled rice)
 Muddapappu Bathukamma: The third day of Bathukamma falls on Vidiya/second day of Ashwayuja masam.
Food offering/Naivedyam: muddapappu (softened boiled lentils), milk and bellam (jaggery)
 Nanabiyyam Bathukamma: The fourth day falls on thidiya/third day of Ashwayuja masam.
Food offering/Naivedyam: nananesina biyyam (wet rice), milk, and bellam (jaggery)
 Atla Bathukamma: The fifth day falls on the chaturthi/fourth day of Ashwayuja masam.

Food offering/Naivedyam: uppidi pindi atlu (pan cakes made from wheatlets), or Dosa
 Aligina Bathukamma: The sixth day falls on the panchami/fifth day of Ashwayuja masam.
No food offering is made.
 Vepakayala Bathukamma: The seventh day falls on the shashti/sixth day of Ashwayuja masam.
Food offering/Naivedyam: rice flour shaped into the fruits of neem tree is deepfried.
 Vennamuddala Bathukamma: The eight day falls on sapthami/seventh day of Ashwayuja masam.
Food offering/Naivedyam: nuvvulu (sesame), Venna (Butter) or ghee (clarified butter), and bellam (jaggery)
 Saddula Bathukamma: The ninth day of bathukamma is celebrated on ashtami/eight day of Ashwayuja masam, and coincides with Durgashtami.
Food offering/Naivedyam: Five types of cooked rice dishes: perugannam saddi (curd rice), chinthapandu pulihora saddi (tamarind rice), nimmakaya saddi (lemon rice), kobbara saddi (coconut rice) and nuvvula saddi (sesame rice)

Saddula Bathukamma
This festival is celebrated for nine days and concludes on Durgashtami. The last day of the festival is called Saddula Bathukamma. On this final day immersion of Bathukamma (Bathukamma Visarjan) in water bodies is celebrated with utmost devotion and enthusiasm with rhythmic drum beats throughout Telangana. The evening offers a beautiful, calming and a peaceful visual treat. 
Gauramma (a symbolic idol of Gowri made of turmeric) is taken back from Bathukamma before immersion and every married woman applies a paste of this, on her Mangala sutra that marks the solemnization of her marriage and also her husband is protected from all evils and ill fate.

For 9 days of festival each day a Nivedyam or a special dish sattu is prepared and offered to the goddess. General ingredients of the dishes are Corn (మొక్క జొన్నలు), Sorghum (జొన్నలు), Bajra (సజ్జలు), Black Gram (మినుములు), Bengal Gram (శనగలు), Green Gram (పెసర్లు), Ground Nuts (పల్లి), Sesame (నువ్వులు), Wheat (గోధుమలు), Rice (బియ్యము), Cashew Nut (Kaju), Jaggery (బెల్లం), Milk (పాలు) etc.
Maleeda - a combination of Roti and Jaggery, is prepared on this day and distributed at the end of the event.

Background

Bathukamma means ‘come back to life mother’ and it is an asking for Goddess Sati to return. Legend has it that Sati returned as Goddess Parvati and therefore the festival is also dedicated to Goddess Parvati.

There are many myths behind this festival. According to one myth Goddess Gauri killed 'Mahishasura' the demon after a fierce fight. After this act, she went to sleep on the 'Ashwayuja Padyami', due to fatigue. The devotees prayed to her to wake up, and she woke up on the Dashami.
 
The other being Bathukamma, as the daughter of the 'Chola' King 'Dharmangada' and 'Satyavati'. The king and queen lost their 100 sons in the battlefield and prayed to Goddess Lakshmi to be born in their house, as their child. Goddess Lakshmi heard their sincere prayers and chose to oblige them. When Lakshmi was born in the royal palace, all the sages came to bless her and they blessed her with immortality "Bathukamma or Live Forever". Since then Bathukamma festival is celebrated by young girls in Telangana. The purpose of this festival is to pray to the Goddess in the belief that the young girls would get husbands as per their wish, to teach the young girls how to take care of their in-laws, their husbands, be great women who respect elders, love people around them, be guides to their younger ones. Further, married women celebrate the festival to pray to the Goddess for good health and prosperity of their families.

Bathukamma or 'Shakthi', according to one legend, is a lover of flowers. Flowers are arranged on a square wooden plank or a square bamboo frame with the size of frames tapering off to form a pinnacle on top. They resemble the shape of a temple 'Gopura'. Gauramma (a symbolic idol of Gowri made of turmeric) is placed on top of the flowers. This little floral mountain is worshipped as Goddess Bathukamma.

This festival is celebrated with joy and gaiety. During these celebrations, there are dance performances, music, dramas and a variety of entertainments as thousands of tourists and locals too, flock to witness the happenings. 'Jataras' are also held during this month long celebrations..

References

Notes

Sources
 http://www.telangana.org/Bathukamma/Bathukamma_BayArea.htm
 Telangan's Floral Festival (http://www.thehansindia.com/posts/index/Hans/2015-10-17/Bruhathamma-Brathukamma-Bathukamma/181367)
 A journey through change (http://www.hindu.com/thehindu/mp/2005/02/22/stories/2005022200770300.htm). The Hindu, 22 February 2005. Retrieved 6 October 2011.
 Savouring Telangana flavour in the US http://www.thehindu.com/todays-paper/tp-national/tp-andhrapradesh/Savouring-Telangana-flavour-in-the-US/article14849697.ece
 Joys of cooking (https://web.archive.org/web/20131015105412/http://www.thehindu.com/life-and-style/Food/article799015.ece), The Hindu, 27 September 2010. Retrieved 6 October 2011.
 "Goddess Gauri" (https://web.archive.org/web/20071216181412/http://www.csuohio.edu/hindu/Gauri.htm%29.
 About Hinduism. Hindu Student Association. Cleveland State University. 2006-02-20. Archived from the original https://web.archive.org/web/20070715223624/http://www.csuohio.edu/hindu/Gauri.htm) on 2007-08-11. Retrieved 2011-10-06.
 Grand finale to Bathukamma (http://www.hindu.com/2007/10/19/stories/2007101958130300.htm), The Hindu, 19 October 2007. Retrieved 6 October 2011.

External links

 Bathukamma Official site
 The festival of Flowers
 The Hindu feature
  Hmtv

Hindu festivals
Festivals in Telangana
Flower festivals in India
Religious festivals in India
September observances
October observances